ArulDev is a music director from Chennai, Tamil Nadu. He has scored music for South Indian films.

Early life 

ArulDev is an Indian film music composer from Madurai. His father was an accordion player and an orchestra organizer.

Career

Film

He shifted to Chennai as he had a great passion to work under Vidyasagar, whom he started to work under in 2000. ArulDev worked on the Malayalam movie Dreamz and then Madhuranombarakattu. Tamil movies ArulDev worked on include Dhil, Vedam, Poovellam Un Vaasam, Run, Dhool, Ghilli, Chandramukhi, Mozhi, and Peranmai. He worked in Tamil, Malayalam, Telugu, Kannada and Hindi class and mass movies. He also worked as a keyboard programmer in the English movie Beyond the Soul.

Vidyasagar is a composer whose music reflects the culture of the land. ArulDev still shares a great rapport with Vidyasagar.

The first movie that ArulDev was signed for was Potta Potti (Patta Patti 50-50) in 2010.

ArulDev teamed up with director Halitha Shameem on Poovarasam Pee Pee, which was launched on 14 May 2014. Behindwoods called the album "sweetly adventurous in its music". Chennai Times rated the album of 3.5/5 and said, "Arul Dev has given listeners a slice of everything for Poovarasam Peepee. He has kept the album simple with likable tunes, yet he keeps the theme of the film intact". MilliBlog said, "Arul Dev finally arrives, putting behind his limited, non-descript repertoire".

The movie was released on 30 May 2014 with a positive reviews from critics. BehindWoods.com rated the movie 3/5 and praised Arul for his songs. FoundPix rated the movie as 8.6 and said the "songs are fantastic and unique. Arul Dev’s background music deserves a special mention".

Aruldev received appreciation from the media as well as music lovers for his background score of Poovarasam PeePee. He believes that the background score is equally important for the film to make a mark, a facet he proved in Poovarasam PeePee.

The film was selected for Chennai International Film Festival 2014.

ArulDev scored the background music for the ads of the Tamil Jannal Samukathin Salaram, a social responsibility magazine. The music received positive reviews.

ArulDev teamed up with director Ira Saravanan for the movie Kaththukkutti. The audio was launched on 28 September 2015. It was also released in Radio Mirchi 98.3 FM on 4 October 2015. The album was given a positive review by music lovers. There was a special mention about the song "Kalakkattu Kannala Menakettu". The movie was launched on 9 October 2015. Vaiko, the Tamil politician, called the movie a must watch for all Tamilians. He mentioned that the background score was well synced with the film. Director Bharathiraja praised the movie. There was also a special mention to the visuals of the duet song, "Kalakkattu Kannala Menakettu".

ArulDev joined with director Madesh to work in his movie Mohini, starring Trisha. Madesh was impressed by ArulDev's keyboard programming as he had worked with Vidhyasagar for his earlier movie Madhura, starring Vijay. ArulDev did the background score for Mohini, which was a big highlight in the movie.

ArulDev worked with J. Parthiban for the movie Mirugaa. The official teaser was published on YouTube and it gained good views.

ArulDev teamed up with Halitha Shameem for third time for the movie Aelay. ArulDev did the background score and situation songs.

ArulDev joined with Blockbuster Director in Kannada films, Pon Kumaran to work with the Tamil movie Golmaal. The movie is produced by Jaguar films. The movie is slated for release in 2023. ArulDev roped in Mangli a famous Telugu folk singer to make her Kollywood debut with Golmaal. Mangli's voice is so unique and Powerful and it was indeed “very special” one recalls ArulDev and adds her introduction in Kollywood would be a special. The first single MMBB STARWAR was released on 15-January-2023 which was sung by S. P. B. Charan, Ranjith, Priyanka Deshpande & Sivaangi Krishnakumar. The song gained over Two million views in YouTube in four days and the song is currently trending in Social media.

Filmography

As singer

Keyboard player

Independent singles

Short films

Ad jingles

References

External links
 

21st-century classical composers
Tamil film score composers
Musicians from Madurai